Aram's New Ground was a cricket venue in Montpelier Gardens, Walworth. Named after its founder George Aram, it was the home of Montpelier Cricket Club and hosted major matches from 1796 to 1806. It was also known as the "Bee Hive Ground" because of its proximity to the Bee Hive pub in Walworth.

The earliest recorded match at Aram's was in June 1796 when a combined Thursday Club and Montpelier team hosted MCC. The ground was last recorded in June 1806 when Montpelier was defeated by Homerton.

The Walworth area had been a location for top-class cricket since the early 18th century and there are references to Walworth Common as a venue for major matches in 1730 and 1732.

References

1796 establishments in England
Cricket grounds in Surrey
Cricket in Surrey
Defunct cricket grounds in England
Defunct sports venues in Surrey
English cricket in the 19th century
English cricket venues in the 18th century
History of Surrey
Sports venues completed in 1796
Sports venues in Surrey